Infanta Isabella Clara Eugenia and Infanta Catherine Michaela is a 1569-1570 oil on canvas painting by Sofonisba Anguissola, now in the Royal Collection at Buckingham Palace. It shows Isabella Clara Eugenia and Catherine Michaela, two daughters of Philip II of Spain and his third wife Elizabeth of Valois.

References

1570 paintings
Infanta
Paintings in the Royal Collection of the United Kingdom
Paintings of children